is a Japanese manga series by Shigeru Tsuchiyama. It has been adapted into a live-action film also known as Sukiyaki in 2011.

Cast
 Tasuku Nagaoka as Kenta Nagoaka
 Masanobu Katsumura as Shinta Minami
 Motoki Ochiai as Shunsuke Aida
 Gitaro as Chanko
 Akaji Maro as Kosanro Hachinohe
 Fumino Kimura as Shiori Mizushima
 Tomoko Tabata as Aya Kurihara
 Yōji Tanaka as Prison officer Ishihara
 Houka Kinoshita as Prison officer Iwamoto
 Denden as Gawara Gosho
 Hana Kido as Chizuru Aida
 Chika Uchida as Mari
 Kazuo Kawabata

References

External links
 Official site 
 

2006 manga
Cooking in anime and manga
Live-action films based on manga
Films directed by Tetsu Maeda
Futabasha manga
Manga adapted into films
Seinen manga
2010s Japanese films